Padre de más de cuatro ("Father of More Than Four") is a 1938 Mexican film. It stars Sara García.

External links
 

1938 films
1930s Spanish-language films
Mexican black-and-white films
Mexican comedy films
1938 comedy films
1930s Mexican films